The "GU230" is a mobile phone manufactured by LG Electronics.  The phone is designed to be low cost, and provide the essentials.

Main Features 
The LG GU230 is a basic slider phone.  The key features are:
Tactile keypad
2.2" LCD Screen
FM radio (with recording)
1.3 Megapixel camera
WAP
Speaker Phone (Handsfree)
CLDC 1.1 and MIDP 2.0 Java Support
In-built Games
3D S-Class User Interface
Calendar and Organiser
Alarm
Customisable Wallpaper
Downloadable Ringtones & Wallpapers

In The Box
When you buy the phone you should get:
LG GU230 Mobile Phone
LG Approved GU230 900mAh 3.7V Li-Ion Battery
A/C Charger
Handsfree (Headset with Microphone)

Technical Specifications 
Here are the technical specifications of this phone.

Carrier Support
Theoretically, the phone should work on any network, if you unlock it.
However, according to the phones website, the phone will work on Crazy Johns only.

Operating Frequency
GSM: 850/900/1500/1900
UMTS: GPRS Class 12/EDGE Class 12

Dimensions
Height: 104mm
Width: 48mm
Thickness: 15.2mm
Weight: 89g

Screen
Size:2.2" LCD
Colours: 262k
Pixels:176x200 (Width x Height)

Memory
Internal: 6 Megabytes
Expandable: Yes, up to 4 Gigabytes MicroSD
Phone Book: Up to 1000 entries

Messaging
The phone can send normal SMS text messages (with T9 (predictive text), as well as MMS, with Video MMS capabilities.  The phone also has email capabilities.

Camera
The phone has a 1.3-megapixel camera with 2 times digital zoom.

Media
Music: Audio formats include MP3, AAC, WMA, RA, AMR and MIDI
Video: Video formats include H.263, and MPEG4
The phone also comes with an FM radio, and like most other phones the headset that comes with the phone is needed.

Battery
The battery that comes with the phone is 3.7V 900mAh Li-Ion, with 350 hours of stand-by time and 3.5 hours of talk time.

Connectivity
The phone comes with Bluetooth and a can be synced with a PC, but you have to buy the USB cable separately.  It has a web upload speed of 48kbit/s.

See also
LG Electronics
LG Electronics Australia

References

LG Electronics mobile phones